Psoralea is a genus in the legume family (Fabaceae) with over 60 closely related species native to southern Africa. In South Africa they are commonly referred to as fountainbush (English); fonteinbos, bloukeur, or penwortel (Afrikaans); and umHlonishwa (Zulu).

Species

 Psoralea abbottii C.H.Stirt.
 Psoralea aculeata L.
 Psoralea affinis Eckl. & Zeyh.
 Psoralea alata (Thunb.) T.M.Salter
 Psoralea angustifolia L'Hér.
 Psoralea aphylla L.
 Psoralea arborea Sims
 Psoralea asarina (P.J.Bergius) T.M.Salter
 Psoralea axillaris L.f.
 Psoralea azuroides C.H.Stirt.
 Psoralea brilliantissima C.H.Stirt., Muasya & A.Bello
 Psoralea cataracta C.H.Stirt.
 Psoralea congesta C.H.Stirt. & Muasya
 Psoralea diturnerae A. Bello, C.H. Stirt. & Muasya 
 Psoralea elegans C.H.Stirt.
 Psoralea ensifolia (Houtt.) Merr.
 Psoralea fascicularis DC. , syn. Psoralea tenuifolia Thunb. , syn. Psoralea thunbergiana Eckl. & Zeyh. 
 Psoralea filifolia Eckl. & Zeyh.
 Psoralea fleta C.H.Stirt.
 Psoralea floccosa C.H.Stirt., Muasya & A.Bello
 Psoralea forbesiae C.H.Stirt., A.Bello & Muasya
 Psoralea gigantea Dludlu, Muasya & C.H.Stirt.
 Psoralea glabra E.Mey.
 Psoralea glaucescens Eckl. & Zeyh.
 Psoralea glaucina Harv.
 Psoralea gueinzii Harv.
 Psoralea imbricata (L.f.) T.M.Salter
 Psoralea imminens C.H.Stirt.
 Psoralea implexa C.H.Stirt.
 Psoralea intonsa C.H.Stirt., Muasya & A.Bello
 Psoralea ivumba C.H.Stirt., A.Bello & Muasya
 Psoralea karooensis C.H.Stirt., Muasya & Vlok
 Psoralea keetii Schönland ex H.M.L.Forbes
 Psoralea kougaensis C.H.Stirt., Muasya & A.Bello
 Psoralea laevigata L.f.
 Psoralea laxa T.M.Salter
 Psoralea margaretiflora C.H.Stirt. & V.R.Clark
 Psoralea monophylla (L.) C.H.Stirt.
 Psoralea montana A.Bello, C.H.Stirt. & Muasya
 Psoralea muirii C.H.Stirt. & Muasya
 Psoralea odoratissima Jacq.
 Psoralea oligophylla Eckl. & Zeyh.
 Psoralea oreophila Schltr.
 Psoralea peratica C.H.Stirt.
 Psoralea pinnata L.
 Psoralea plauta C.H.Stirt.
 Psoralea pullata C.H.Stirt.
 Psoralea ramulosa C.H.Stirt.
 Psoralea repens P.J.Bergius
 Psoralea restioides Eckl. & Zeyh.
 Psoralea rhizotoma C.H.Stirt. & Muasya
 Psoralea rigidula C.H.Stirt.
 Psoralea semota C.H.Stirt.
 Psoralea sordida C.H.Stirt. & Muasya
 Psoralea speciosa Eckl. & Zeyh.
 Psoralea suaveolens C.H.Stirt., A.Bello & Muasya
 Psoralea tenuifolia L.
 Psoralea tenuissima E.Mey.
 Psoralea triflora Thunb.
 Psoralea trullata C.H.Stirt.
 Psoralea usitata C.H.Stirt.
 Psoralea vanberkeliae C.H.Stirt., A.Bello & Muasya
 Psoralea verrucosa Willd. ex Spreng.

Ref:

References

External links

Psoraleeae
Tumbleweeds
Fabaceae genera